Anuga multiplicans is a moth of the family Noctuidae first described by Francis Walker in 1858. It is found in India, Sri Lanka, Hong Kong, Korea, Taiwan, Philippines and Borneo.

Forewings darker and with subtornal orange spot. Discal spot on hindwing. Hindwing tornus is orange.

Subspecies
Two subspecies are recognized. However, subspecies rotunda is sometimes considered to be a sister-species of A. multiplicans.

Anuga multiplicans elegans Prout, 1928
Anuga multiplicans rotunda Walker, 1858

Gallery

References

Moths of Asia
Moths described in 1858
Euteliinae